Sarah Hull Cleveland is an American law professor and noted expert in international law and the constitutional law of U.S. foreign relations, with particular interests in the status of international law in U.S. domestic law, international and comparative human rights law, international humanitarian law, and national security. She is the current nominee to be the Legal Adviser of the Department of State in the Biden administration. She will be nominated to be a judge on the International Court of Justice.

Cleveland is the Louis Henkin Professor of Human and Constitutional Rights at Columbia Law School.  In 2014, she was nominated by the United States and elected to serve a four-year term as an independent expert on the United Nations Human Rights Committee. She was the Co-Coordinating Reporter of the American Law Institute's project on the Restatement (Fourth) of the Foreign Relations Law of the United States, and the U.S. Member on the Venice Commission of the Council of Europe.

Education and judicial clerkships
Cleveland was awarded an A.B. with honors at Brown University in 1987 (Junior Phi Beta Kappa); an M.St. from Lincoln College, Oxford University (Rhodes Scholar), in 1989; and a J.D. from Yale Law School in 1992.

Immediately after law school, she clerked for Judge Louis F. Oberdorfer on the United States District Court for the District of Columbia, and then for Justice Harry Blackmun of the Supreme Court of the United States during the 1993-1994 Term.

Career
From 2009 to 2011, Cleveland served as the Counselor on International Law to the Legal Adviser at the U.S. Department of State, where she supervised the office's legal work relating to the law of war, counterterrorism, and Afghanistan and Pakistan, and assisted with its international human rights and international justice work. She continues to serve as a member of the Secretary of State's Advisory Committee on International Law. She is a former member of the Executive Council of the American Society of International Law, and a Council Member of the International Bar Association's Human Rights Institute.

A native of Alabama, Cleveland began her legal career as a Skadden Fellow representing migrant farmworkers in South Florida. In March 2014, Cleveland was nominated by the U.S. government to serve as an independent expert on the Human Rights Committee, the United Nations treaty body that monitors state implementation of the International Covenant on Civil and Political Rights. The committee holds three-month-long meetings each year to review state implementation of the multilateral treaty. The states parties to the multilateral treaty elected her to the committee on June 24, 2014.  Her four-year term on the Committee ran for the calendar years 2015-2018.

Cleveland was the U.S. Observer Member to the Venice Commission of the Council of Europe and is a member of the Secretary of State's Advisory Committee on International Law, and of the American Law Institute.

She has been involved in human rights litigation in the United States and before the Inter-American Court of Human Rights. Before joining the Columbia Law School faculty in 2007, she taught at the Harvard, University of Michigan, and University of Texas law schools, and at Oxford University.

She serves on the board of directors of Human Rights First.

Biden administration
On August 10, 2021, President Joe Biden nominated Cleveland to be the legal adviser of the Department of State. Hearings were held before the Senate Foreign Relations Committee on Cleveland's nomination on January 12, 2022. The committee deadlocked on her nomination on March 8, 2022. The entire Senate must now move to discharge her nomination from the committee.

Writings
Cleveland has written widely on issues of international law, human rights, and U.S. foreign relations law. She is a co-author of Louis Henkin's Human Rights casebook (2nd ed. 2009 and update 2013) and Paul Stephen and Sarah Cleveland, eds., The Restatement and Beyond: The Past, Present, and Future of U.S. Foreign Relations Law (Oxford University Press, 2020). She served on the board of editors of the Journal of International Economic Law and of the International Review of the Red Cross, and still serves on board of editors of the Columbia Journal of Transnational Law.

Personal life
Cleveland lives in New York and has two children, Richard and Electa.

See also
 List of law clerks of the Supreme Court of the United States (Seat 2)

References

Selected publications

External links
Columbia Law School bio

Living people
Year of birth missing (living people)
Brown University alumni
American Rhodes Scholars
Yale Law School alumni
American legal scholars
Columbia Law School faculty
University of Texas School of Law faculty
Law clerks of the Supreme Court of the United States
Place of birth missing (living people)
International law scholars
American women lawyers
American women legal scholars
American women academics
United Nations Human Rights Committee members
21st-century American women